The Tlayúa Formation is an Early Cretaceous (late Albian) geological formation near Tepexi de Rodríguez, Puebla.

Paleobiota 
The formation contains a diverse array of vertebrate and invertebrate fossils. About 70% of the macrofossils are osteichthyan fish. Other vertebrates include chelonians, pterosaurs, lepidosaurs, and crocodiles.  Cyanobacteria, foraminifera, algae, gymnosperms, sponges, cnidarians, annelids, gastropods, ammonites, bivalves, arachnids, insects, isopods, anomurans, brachyurans, crinoids, echinoids, holothuroids, stelleroids, and ophiuroids,
have also been recovered from the Tlayúa Formation.

Lepidosaurs 

Other fossils

 Archaeoniscus aranguthyorum
 Axelrodichthys cf. araripensis
 Ophiactis applegatei
 Paleopentacta alencasterae
 Parapsolus tlayuensis
 Protaegla miniscula
 Quetzalichthys perrilliatae
 Teoichthys kallistos
 Tepexicarcinus tlayuaensis
 Tepexichthys aranguthyrom
 cf. Araucaria sp.
 Brachyphyllum sp.
 Ellimmichthys sp.
 Lepidotes sp.
 Megalops sp.
 Notelops sp.
 Podozamites sp.	
 Vinctifer sp.
 Zamites sp.	
 Testudines indet.

References

Further reading 
 L. Martin-Medrano and P. Garcia-Barrera. 2006. Fossil Ophiuroids of Mexico. In F. J. Vega, T. G. Nybor, M. D. C. Perrillat, M. Montellano-Ballesteros, S. R. S. Cevallos-Ferriz, S. A. Quiroz-Barroso (eds.), Topics in Geobiology 24:115-131

Geologic formations of Mexico
Cretaceous Mexico
Lower Cretaceous Series of North America
Albian Stage
Mudstone formations
Paleontology in Mexico
Geography of Puebla
Natural history of Puebla